Glenn Rex Campbell (April 20, 1904 – September 16, 1973) was an American football end who played for six seasons for three teams, the New York Giants, Philadelphia Eagles and the Pittsburgh Steelers. He played college football at the Emporia State University for the Emporia State Hornets football team.

References

1904 births
1973 deaths
People from Topeka, Kansas
Players of American football from Kansas
American football ends
New York Giants players
Philadelphia Eagles players
Pittsburgh Steelers players
Emporia State Hornets football players